Tin String is a 2019 Burmese horror film directed by Arkar and starring Phyo Ngwe Soe, Eaindra Kyaw Zin, Shwe Eain Si, Ye Naung and Yell Htwe Aung. The film, produced by Golden Hour Film Production and premiered in Myanmar on November 21, 2019.

Cast
 Phyo Ngwe Soe as Ye Thway
 Eaindra Kyaw Zin as Thel Chit Yar
 Shwe Eain Si as Nan Eain Shin
 Ye Naung as Sai Naung
 Aung Ye Htwe as Htoo Lwin

References

2019 films
2010s Burmese-language films
Burmese horror films
Films shot in Myanmar
2019 horror films